

Current sporting seasons

American football 2011

National Football League
NCAA Division I FBS
NCAA Division I FCS

Auto racing 2012

World Rally Championship

Basketball 2012

NBA
NCAA Division I men
NCAA Division I women
Euroleague
EuroLeague Women
Eurocup
EuroChallenge
ASEAN Basketball League
Australia
France
Germany
Greece
Israel
Italy
Philippines
Philippine Cup
Russia
Spain
Turkey

Cricket 2012

Australia:
Sheffield Shield
Ryobi One-Day Cup

Football (soccer) 2012

National teams competitions
2014 FIFA World Cup qualification
UEFA Women's Euro 2013 qualifying
International clubs competitions
UEFA (Europe) Champions League
UEFA Europa League
UEFA Women's Champions League
Copa Libertadores (South America)
CONCACAF (North & Central America) Champions League
OFC (Oceania) Champions League
Domestic (national) competitions
Australia
England
France
Germany
Iran
Italy
Portugal
Russia
Scotland
Spain

Ice hockey 2012

National Hockey League
Kontinental Hockey League
Czech Extraliga
Elitserien
Canadian Hockey League:
OHL, QMJHL, WHL
NCAA Division I men
NCAA Division I women

Rugby union 2012

Heineken Cup
Amlin Challenge Cup
Aviva Premiership
RaboDirect Pro12
LV= Cup
Top 14
Sevens World Series

Snooker 2012

Players Tour Championship

Tennis 2012

ATP World Tour
WTA Tour

Volleyball 2012

International clubs competitions
Men's CEV Champions League
Women's CEV Champions League

Winter sports

Alpine Skiing World Cup
Biathlon World Cup
Bobsleigh World Cup
Cross-Country Skiing World Cup
Freestyle Skiing World Cup
Luge World Cup
Nordic Combined World Cup
Short Track Speed Skating World Cup
Skeleton World Cup
Ski Jumping World Cup
Snowboard World Cup
Speed Skating World Cup

Days of the month

January 31, 2012 (Tuesday)

Football (soccer)

Africa Cup of Nations in Equatorial Guinea and Gabon (teams in bold advance to the quarterfinals):
Group C:
 1–0 
 0–1 
Standings: Gabon 9 points, Tunisia 6, Morocco 3, Niger 0.
Copa Libertadores First Stage, second leg (teams in bold advance to the Second Stage):
Sport Huancayo  1–1  Arsenal. Arsenal win 4–1 on points.
Libertad  4–1  El Nacional. 3–3 on points; Libertad win 4–2 on aggregate.

Futsal

European Men's Championship in Croatia:
Group A in Split:  2–1 
Group B in Zagreb:  4–2

Handball

Asian Men's Championship in Jeddah, Saudi Arabia:
Group A:  25–27 
Group B:  24–24

January 30, 2012 (Monday)

Cricket
Zimbabwe in New Zealand:
Only Test in Napier:

Football (soccer)
Africa Cup of Nations in Equatorial Guinea and Gabon (teams in bold advance to the quarterfinals):
Group B:
 2–1 
 2–0 
Standings: Côte d'Ivoire 9 points, Sudan, Angola 4, Burkina Faso 0.

Handball
Asian Men's Championship in Jeddah, Saudi Arabia:
Group A:
 25–17 
 26–27 
Group B:
 28–21 
 15–52

January 29, 2012 (Sunday)

Alpine skiing
Men's World Cup in Garmisch, Germany: Super Giant Slalom
Women's World Cup in St. Moritz, Switzerland: Downhill

American football
NFL playoffs:
Pro Bowl in Honolulu: AFC 59, NFC 41

Basketball
PBA Philippine Cup Finals in Quezon City, Philippines:
Game 6: Talk 'N Text Tropang Texters 110, Powerade Tigers 101. Talk 'N Text win series 4–1.
Talk 'N Text win their fourth league title in three years and complete the first successful PBA Philippine Cup title defense since 1985.

Cricket
Pakistan vs England in UAE:
2nd Test in Abu Dhabi

Figure skating
United States Championships in San Jose, California

Football (soccer)
Africa Cup of Nations in Equatorial Guinea and Gabon (teams in bold advance to the quarterfinals):
Group A:
 0–1 
 2–1 
Standings: Zambia 7 points, Equatorial Guinea 6, Libya 4, Senegal 0.
CONCACAF Women's Olympic Qualifying Tournament in Vancouver, Canada:
Final:  4–0 
United States and Canada qualify for the Olympic Tournament.

Freestyle skiing
World Cup in Calgary, Alberta, Canada: Aerials

Handball
European Men's Championship in Belgrade, Serbia:
Bronze medal game:   31–27 
Final:   19–21  
Denmark win the title for the second time, and qualify for the Olympic Tournament.
Asian Men's Championship in Jeddah, Saudi Arabia:
Group A:  27–30 
Group B:  14–47

Luge
World Cup 7 in St. Moritz, Switzerland

Nordic combined
World Cup in Zakopane, Poland:
HS 130 / Penalty Race (TBC)

Short track speed skating
European Championships in Mladá Boleslav, Czech Republic:

Ski jumping
Men's World Cup in Sapporo, Japan:
HS 134:

Speed skating
World Sprint Championships in Calgary, Canada

Tennis
Grand Slams:
Australian Open in Melbourne, Australia, day 14:
Men's Singles Final: Novak Djokovic  [1] vs. Rafael Nadal  [2]

Water polo
Men's European Championship in Eindhoven, Netherlands:
Bronze medal match:  9–12  
Final:   9–8  
Serbia win the title for the fifth time.

January 28, 2012 (Saturday)

Alpine skiing
Men's World Cup in Garmisch, Germany: Downhill
Women's World Cup in St. Moritz, Switzerland: Super combined

American Football
NCAA bowl games:
Senior Bowl in Mobile, Alabama: North 23, South 13

Cricket
India in Australia:
4th Test in Adelaide

Figure skating
European Championships in Sheffield, Great Britain:
Men:
Ladies:
United States Championships in San Jose, California

Football (soccer)
Africa Cup of Nations in Equatorial Guinea and Gabon:
Group D in Franceville:
 1–6 
 2–1

Freestyle skiing
World Cup in Calgary, Alberta, Canada: Moguls

Handball
Asian Men's Championship in Jeddah, Saudi Arabia:
Group A:
 35–22 
 26–21 
Group B:
 26–27 
 26–19

Luge
World Cup 7 in St. Moritz, Switzerland

Mixed martial arts
UFC on Fox: Evans vs. Davis in Chicago, United States:
Middleweight bout: Chris Weidman  def. Demian Maia  via unanimous decision (29–28, 29–28, 30–27)
Middleweight bout: Chael Sonnen  def. Michael Bisping  via unanimous decision (30–27, 29–28, 29–28)
Light Heavyweight bout: Rashad Evans  def. Phil Davis  via unanimous decision (50–45, 50–45, 50–45)

Nordic combined
World Cup in Zakopane, Poland:
HS 134 / 10 km

Ski jumping
Men's World Cup in Sapporo, Japan:
HS 134 (night)

Snowboarding
World Cup in Sudenfeld, Germany: Giant Slalom

Speed skating
World Sprint Championships in Calgary, Canada

Tennis
Grand Slams:
Australian Open in Melbourne, Australia, day 13:
Women's Singles Final: Victoria Azarenka  [3] vs. Maria Sharapova  [4]
Men's Doubles Final: Bob Bryan  / Mike Bryan  [1] vs. Leander Paes  / Radek Štěpánek 
Girls' Singles Final: Taylor Townsend  [14] vs. Yulia Putintseva  [4]
Boys' Singles Final: Luke Saville  [1] vs. Filip Peliwo 
Wheelchair Women's Singles Final: Esther Vergeer  [1] vs. Aniek Van Koot  [2]
Wheelchair Men's Singles Final: Maikel Scheffers  [1] vs. Nicolas Peifer 
Wheelchair Quad Singles: David Wagner  [1] vs. Peter Norfolk  [2]

Water polo
Women's European Championship in Eindhoven, Netherlands:
Bronze medal match:   9–8 
Final:   13–10  
Italy win the title for the fifth time

January 27, 2012 (Friday)

Figure skating
European Championships in Sheffield, Great Britain:
Ice dancing:  Nathalie Péchalat / Fabian Bourzat  164.18  Ekaterina Bobrova / Dmitri Soloviev  160.23  Elena Ilinykh / Nikita Katsalapov  153.12
Péchalat and Bourzat win the title for the second successive time.

Football (soccer)
Africa Cup of Nations in Equatorial Guinea and Gabon:
Group C in Libreville:
 1–2 
 3–2 
CONCACAF Women's Olympic Qualifying Tournament in Vancouver, Canada:
Semifinals:
 3–0 
 3–1

Handball
European Men's Championship in Belgrade, Serbia:
Semifinals:
 25–24 
 26–22 
Asian Men's Championship in Jeddah, Saudi Arabia:
Group A:
 25–13 
 26–27 
Group B:  41–19

Tennis
Grand Slams:
Australian Open in Melbourne, Australia, day 12:
Men's Singles Semifinals: Novak Djokovic  [1] def. Andy Murray  [4] 6–3, 3–6, 6–7(4–7), 6–1, 7–5
Women's Doubles Final: Svetlana Kuznetsova  / Vera Zvonareva  def. Sara Errani  / Roberta Vinci  [11] 5–7, 6–4, 6–3
Kuznetsova wins her second Australian Open and Grand Slam women's doubles title.
Zvonareva wins her second Grand Slam women's doubles title.
Boys' Doubles Final: Liam Broady  / Joshua Ward-Hibbert  [6] def. Adam Pavlásek  / Filip Veger  6–3, 6–2
Girls' Doubles Final: Gabrielle Andrews  / Taylor Townsend  def. Irina Khromacheva  / Danka Kovinić  [1] 5–7, 7–5, [10–6]
Wheelchair Men's Doubles Final: Ronald Vink  / Robin Ammerlaan  [2] def. Stéphane Houdet  / Nicolas Peifer  [1] 6–2, 4–6, 6–1
Wheelchair Women's Doubles Final: Esther Vergeer  / Sharon Walraven  [1] def. Aniek van Koot  / Marjolein Buis  [2] 4–6, 6–2, 6–4

Water polo
Men's European Championship in Eindhoven, Netherlands:
Semifinals:
 8–12 
 14–13

January 26, 2012 (Thursday)

Basketball
Euroleague Top 16 matchday 2:
Group E: Galatasaray Medical Park  78–77  Olympiacos
Group H: Maccabi Tel Aviv  57–71  FC Barcelona Regal

Figure skating
European Championships in Sheffield, Great Britain:
Pairs (all ):  Tatiana Volosozhar/Maxim Trankov 210.45 points  Vera Bazarova/Yuri Larionov 193.79  Ksenia Stolbova/Fedor Klimov 171.81
Volosozhar and Trankov win their first European title.

Football (soccer)
Africa Cup of Nations in Equatorial Guinea and Gabon:
Group B in Malabo:
 2–2 
 2–0 
Copa Libertadores First Stage, first leg: Peñarol  4–0  Caracas

Handball
Asian Men's Championship in Jeddah, Saudi Arabia:
Group B:
 40–20 
 23–23

Snooker
Championship League Group four in Stock, England:
Final (both : Mark Selby 1–3 Mark Davis

Tennis
Grand Slams:
Australian Open in Melbourne, Australia, day 11:
Women's Singles Semifinals:
Victoria Azarenka  [3] def. Kim Clijsters  [11] 6–4, 1–6, 6–3
Maria Sharapova  [4] def. Petra Kvitová  [2] 6–2, 3–6, 6–4
Men's Singles Semifinals: Rafael Nadal  [2] def. Roger Federer  [3] 6–7(5), 6–2, 7–6(5), 6–4
Wheelchair Quad Doubles Final: Andrew Lapthorne  / Peter Norfolk  def. David Wagner  / Noam Gershony  6–4, 6–2

Water polo
Women's European Championship in Eindhoven, Netherlands:
Semifinals:
 12–14 
 13–12

January 25, 2012 (Wednesday)

Basketball
Euroleague Top 16 matchday 2:
Group E: CSKA Moscow  96–68  Anadolu Efes
Group F:
Gescrap Bizkaia  85–70  Unicaja
Real Madrid  69–88  Montepaschi Siena
Group G:
Fenerbahçe Ülker  65–63  EA7 Emporio Armani
Panathinaikos  83–89  UNICS Kazan
Group H: Bennet Cantù  79–78  Žalgiris Kaunas

Football (soccer)
Africa Cup of Nations in Equatorial Guinea and Gabon:
Group A in Bata:
 2–2 
 2–1 
Copa Libertadores First Stage, first leg:
Real Potosí  2–1  Flamengo
Internacional  1–0  Once Caldas
Unión Española  1–0  UANL

Handball
European Men's Championship in Serbia (teams in bold advance to the semifinals):
Group I in Belgrade:
 33–32 
 31–24 
 19–22 
Standings: Serbia 7 points, Denmark 6, Germany, Macedonia, Poland 5, Sweden 2.
Group II in Novi Sad:
 29–29 
 35–32 
 24–24 
Standings: Spain 9, Croatia 7, Slovenia, Hungary 4, Iceland, France 3.

Tennis
Grand Slams:
Australian Open in Melbourne, Australia, day 10:
Men's Singles Quarterfinals:
Andy Murray  [4] def. Kei Nishikori  [24] 6–3, 6–3, 6–1
Novak Djokovic  [1] def. David Ferrer  [5] 6–4, 7–6(4), 6–1
Women's Singles Quarterfinals:
Petra Kvitová  [2] def. Sara Errani  6–4, 6–4
Maria Sharapova  [4] def. Ekaterina Makarova  6–2, 6–3

Water polo
Men's European Championship in Eindhoven, Netherlands:
Quarterfinals:
 9–4 
 9–11

January 24, 2012 (Tuesday)

Alpine skiing
Men's World Cup in Schladming, Austria:
Slalom:

Football (soccer)
Africa Cup of Nations in Equatorial Guinea and Gabon:
Group D in Franceville:
 1–0 
 1–0 
CONCACAF Women's Olympic Qualifying Tournament in Vancouver, Canada (teams in bold advance to the semifinals):
Group B:
 6–0 
 4–0 
Standings: United States 9 points, Mexico 6, Guatemala 3, Dominican Republic 0.
Copa Libertadores First Stage, first leg:
Arsenal  3–0  Sport Huancayo
El Nacional  1–0  Libertad

Handball
European Men's Championship in Serbia:
Group II in Novi Sad:
 31–26 
 22–29 
 30–32

Snooker
Championship League Group three in Stock, England:
Final: Mark Selby  2–3 Neil Robertson

Tennis
Grand Slams:
Australian Open in Melbourne, Australia, day 9:
Men's Singles Quarterfinals:
Rafael Nadal  [2] def. Tomáš Berdych  [7] 6–7(5), 7–6(6), 6–4, 6–3
Roger Federer  [3] def. Juan Martín del Potro  [11] 6–4, 6–3, 6–2
Women's Singles Quarterfinals:
Kim Clijsters  [11] def. Caroline Wozniacki  [1] 6–3, 7–6(4)
Victoria Azarenka  [3] def. Agnieszka Radwańska  [8] 6–7(0), 6–0, 6–2

Water polo
Women's European Championship in Eindhoven, Netherlands:
Quarterfinals:
 11–9 
 13–13 (4–2 pen.)

January 23, 2012 (Monday)

Football (soccer)
Africa Cup of Nations in Equatorial Guinea and Gabon:
Group C in Libreville:
 2–0 
 1–2 
CONCACAF Women's Olympic Qualifying Tournament in Vancouver, Canada (teams in bold advance to the semifinals):
Group A:
 0–3 
 5–1 
Standings: Canada 9 points, Costa Rica 6, Haiti 3, Cuba 0.

Handball
European Men's Championship in Serbia:
Group I in Belgrade:
 25–27 
 28–26 
 24–21

Tennis
Grand Slams:
Australian Open in Melbourne, Australia, day 8:
Men's Singles 4th Round:
Novak Djokovic  [1] def. Lleyton Hewitt  6–1, 6–3, 4–6, 6–3
Andy Murray  [4] def. Mikhail Kukushkin  6–1, 6–1, 1–0 retired
David Ferrer  [5] def. Richard Gasquet  [17] 6–4, 6–4, 6–1
Kei Nishikori  [24] def. Jo-Wilfried Tsonga  [6] 2–6, 6–2, 6–1, 3–6, 6–3
Women's Singles 4th Round:
Petra Kvitová  [2] def. Ana Ivanovic  [21] 6–2, 7–6(7–2)
Maria Sharapova  [4] def. Sabine Lisicki  [14] 3–6, 6–2, 6–3

Water polo
Men's European Championship in Eindhoven, Netherlands (teams in bold advance to the semifinals, teams in italics advance to the quarterfinals):
Group A:
 2–22 
 8–10 
 10–7 
Standings: Hungary 15 points, Italy 12, Greece 9, Netherlands 6, Macedonia 3, Turkey 0.
Group B:
 11–10 
 7–11 
 9–10 
Standings: Serbia 12 points, Montenegro 10, Germany, Croatia 9, Spain 4, Romania 0.

January 22, 2012 (Sunday)

Alpine skiing
Men's World Cup in Kitzbühel, Austria:
Slalom:
Combined:
Women's World Cup in Kranjska Gora, Slovenia:
Slalom:

American football
NFL playoffs:
Conference Championships:
AFC: New England Patriots 23, Baltimore Ravens 20
NFC: New York Giants 20, San Francisco 49ers 17  (OT)

Auto racing
World Rally Championship:
 Rallye Automobile Monte-Carlo in Monte Carlo:

Biathlon
World Cup 6 in Antholz-Anterselva, Italy:
12.5 km Mass Start Women:
4x7.5 km Relay Men:

Bobsleigh
World Cup in St. Moritz, Switzerland:
Four-man:

Cricket
Sri Lanka in South Africa:
5th ODI in Johannesburg:  312/4 (50 overs);  314/8 (49.5 overs). Sri Lanka win by 2 wickets, South Africa win the 5-match series 3–2.

Cross-country skiing
World Cup in Otepää, Estonia:
15 km Classic men:
10 km Classic women:

Figure skating
Canadian Championships in Moncton, New Brunswick:
Men:  Patrick Chan 302.14 points  Kevin Reynolds 239.44  Jeremy Ten 207.50
Chan wins the title for the fifth successive time.

Football (soccer)
Africa Cup of Nations in Equatorial Guinea and Gabon:
Group B in Malabo:
 1–0 
 1–2 
CONCACAF Women's Olympic Qualifying Tournament in Vancouver, Canada:
Group B:
 7–0 
 13–0

Handball
European Men's Championship in Serbia:
Group II in Novi Sad:
 21–27 
 28–26 
 24–22

Luge
World Cup 6 in Winterberg, Germany:

Multi-sport events
Winter Youth Olympics in Innsbruck, Austria:
Bobsleigh – Two-boys:
Bobsleigh – Two-Girls:
Curling – Mixed doubles:
Ice hockey – Boys:
Ice hockey – Girls:

Rugby union
Heineken Cup pool stage Matchday 6 (team in bold advances to the quarterfinals):
Amlin Challenge Cup pool stage Matchday 6 (team in bold advances to the quarterfinals):

Snooker
Masters in London, England:
Final: Neil Robertson  vs Shaun Murphy

Speed skating
World Cup 4 in Kearns, Utah, United States:
500 m women:
500 m men:
1000 m women:
1000 m men:

Tennis
Grand Slams:
Australian Open in Melbourne, Australia, day 7:
Men's Singles 4th Round:
Rafael Nadal  [2] def. Feliciano López  [18] 6–4, 6–4, 6–2
Roger Federer  [3] def. Bernard Tomic  6–4, 6–2, 6–2
Tomáš Berdych  [7] def. Nicolás Almagro  [10] 4–6, 7–6(5), 7–6(3), 7–6(2)
Women's Singles 4th Round:
Caroline Wozniacki  [1] def. Jelena Janković  [13] 6–0, 7–5
Victoria Azarenka  [3] def. Iveta Benešová  6–2, 6–2
Kim Clijsters  [11] def. Li Na  [5] 4–6, 7–6(6), 6–4
Clijsters saves 4 match points in the second set tie-breaker.
Agnieszka Radwańska  [8] def. Julia Görges  [22] 6–1, 6–1

Water polo
Women's European Championship in Eindhoven, Netherlands (teams in bold advance to the semifinals, teams in italics advance to the quarterfinals):
Group A:
 12–6 
 9–12 
Standings: Russia 9 points, Hungary 6, Netherlands 3, Great Britain 0.
Group B:
 12–18 
 8–6 
Standings: Greece 9 points, Italy 6, Spain 3, Germany 0.

January 21, 2012 (Saturday)

Alpine skiing
Men's World Cup in Kitzbühel, Austria:
Downhill:
Women's World Cup in Kranjska Gora, Slovenia:
Giant slalom:

Biathlon
World Cup 6 in Antholz-Anterselva, Italy:
4x6 km Relay Women:
15 km Mass Start Men:

Bobsleigh
World Cup in St. Moritz, Switzerland:
Two-man:

Cross-country skiing
World Cup in Otepää, Estonia:
Sprint Classic men:
Sprint Classic women:

Figure skating
Canadian Championships in Moncton, New Brunswick:
Women:  Amelie Lacoste 159.51 points  Cynthia Phaneuf 157.94  Kaetlyn Osmond 155.47
Lacoste wins the title for the first time.
Pairs:  Meagan Duhamel / Eric Radford 190.11 points  Jessica Dube / Sebastien Wolfe 171.60  Paige Lawrence / Rudi Swiegers 168.84
Duhamel and Radford win the title for the first time.
Ice Dancing:  Tessa Virtue / Scott Moir 180.02 points  Kaitlyn Weaver / Andrew Poje 174.53  Piper Gilles / Paul Poirier 163.54
Virtue and Moir win the title for the fourth time.

Football (soccer)
Africa Cup of Nations in Equatorial Guinea and Gabon:
Group A in Bata:
 1–0 
 1–2 
CONCACAF Women's Olympic Qualifying Tournament in Vancouver, Canada:
Group A:
 0–2 
 2–0

Freestyle skiing
World Cup in Lake Placid, United States:
Aerials men:
Aerials women:

Handball
European Men's Championship in Serbia:
Group I in Belgrade:
 29–29 
 33–32 
 21–21

Luge
World Cup 6 in Winterberg, Germany:
Men:
Doubles:

Multi-sport events
Winter Youth Olympics in Innsbruck, Austria:

Rugby union
Heineken Cup pool stage Matchday 6 (team in bold advances to the quarterfinals):
Amlin Challenge Cup pool stage Matchday 6 (team in bold advances to the quarterfinals):

Skeleton
World Cup in St. Moritz, Switzerland:
Men:

Ski jumping
Men's World Cup in Zakopane, Poland:
HS 134 (night):

Speed skating
World Cup 4 in Kearns, Utah, United States:
500 m women:
500 m men:
1000 m women:
1000 m men:

Tennis
Grand Slams:
Australian Open in Melbourne, Australia, day 6:
Men's Singles 3rd Round:
Novak Djokovic  [1] def. Nicolas Mahut  6–0, 6–1, 6–1
Andy Murray  [4] def. Michaël Llodra  6–4, 6–2, 6–0
David Ferrer  [5] def. Juan Ignacio Chela  [27] 7–5, 6–2, 6–1
Jo-Wilfried Tsonga  [6] def. Frederico Gil  6–2, 6–2, 6–2
Richard Gasquet  [17] def. Janko Tipsarević  [9] 6–3, 6–3, 6–1
Women's Singles 3rd Round:
Petra Kvitová  [2] def. Maria Kirilenko  [27] 6–0, 1–0 retired
Maria Sharapova  [4] def. Angelique Kerber  [30] 6–1, 6–2
Ekaterina Makarova  def. Vera Zvonareva  [7] 7–6(9–7), 6–1
Zheng Jie  def. Marion Bartoli  [9] 6–3, 6–3

Water polo
Men's European Championship in Eindhoven, Netherlands:
Group A:
 5–15 
 7–12 
 7–9 
Group B:
 14–5 
 10–10 
 10–9

January 20, 2012 (Friday)

Alpine skiing
Men's World Cup in Kitzbühel, Austria:
Super Giant Slalom:

Biathlon
World Cup 6 in Antholz-Anterselva, Italy:
10 km Sprint Men:

Bobsleigh
World Cup in St. Moritz, Switzerland (all GER):
Women:  Anja Schneiderheinze/Lisette Thöne 2:17.84 (1:09.31, 1:08.53))  Cathleen Martini/Janine Tischer 2:17.93 (1:09.30, 1:08.63)  Sandra Kiriasis/Franziska Bertels 2:18.05 (1:09.46, 1:08.59)

Cricket
Sri Lanka in South Africa:
4th ODI in Kimberley:  299/7 (50 overs);  304/5 (48.4 overs). Sri Lanka win by 5 wickets.

Football (soccer)
CONCACAF Women's Olympic Qualifying Tournament in Vancouver, Canada:
Group B:
 5–0 
 0–14

Freestyle skiing
World Cup in Lake Placid, United States:
Aerials men:
Aerials women:

Handball
European Men's Championship in Serbia (teams in bold advance to the Main Round):
Group C in Novi Sad:
 30–27 
 23–26 
Standings: Spain 5 points, Hungary 4, France 2, Russia 1.
Group D in Vršac:
 32–34 
 26–20 
Standings: Croatia 6 points, Slovenia, Iceland, Norway 2.
African Men's Championship in Salè, Morocco:
Bronze medal game:   29–15 
Final:   23–20  
Tunisia win the title for the second successive time and ninth time overall, and qualify for the 2012 Summer Olympics.
African Women's Championship in Salé, Morocco:
Bronze medal game:   33–24 
Final:   26–24  
Angola win the title for the eighth successive time and 11th time overall, and qualify for the 2012 Summer Olympics.

Mixed martial arts
UFC on FX: Guillard vs. Miller in Nashville, Tennessee, United States:
Heavyweight bout: Patrick Barry  def. Christian Morecraft  via KO (punches)
Bantamweight bout: Mike Easton  def. Jared Papazian  via majority decision (29–28, 30–27, 29–29)
Welterweight bout: Josh Neer  def. Duane Ludwig  via technical submission (guillotine choke)
Lightweight bout: Jim Miller  def. Melvin Guillard  via submission (rear-naked choke)

Multi-sport events
Winter Youth Olympics in Innsbruck, Austria:

Rugby union
Heineken Cup pool stage Matchday 6 (team in bold advances to the quarterfinals):
Amlin Challenge Cup pool stage Matchday 6 (team in bold advances to the quarterfinals):

Skeleton
World Cup in St. Moritz, Switzerland:
Women:  Elizabeth Yarnold  1:11.93  Shelley Rudman  1:12.18  Katharina Heinz  1:12.22

Ski jumping
Men's World Cup in Zakopane, Poland:
HS 134 (night):

Sumo
Hatsu basho (January grand tournament) in Tokyo, Japan:
Baruto Kaito wins the tournament and becomes the first Estonian sumo wrestler to win a makuuchi (top division) championship in history.

Tennis
Grand Slams:
Australian Open in Melbourne, Australia, day 5:
Men's Singles 3rd Round:
Rafael Nadal  [2] def. Lukáš Lacko  [Q] 6–2, 6–4, 6–2
Roger Federer  [3] def. Ivo Karlović  7–6(6), 7–5, 6–3
Tomáš Berdych  [7] def. Kevin Anderson  [30] 7–6(5), 7–6(7–1), 6–1
Nicolás Almagro  [10] def. Stanislas Wawrinka  [21] 7–6(2), 6–2, 6–4
Women's Singles 3rd Round:
Caroline Wozniacki  [1] def. Monica Niculescu  [31] 6–2, 6–2
Victoria Azarenka  [3] def. Mona Barthel  6–2, 6–4
Li Na  [5] def. Anabel Medina Garrigues  [26] 3–0 retired
Agnieszka Radwańska  [8] def. Galina Voskoboeva  6–2, 6–2

Water polo
Women's European Championship in Eindhoven, Netherlands:
Group A:
 15–10 
 9–8  
Group B:
 6–12 
 15–11

January 19, 2012 (Thursday)

Basketball
Euroleague Top 16 matchday 1:
Group E: Anadolu Efes  68–62  Galatasaray Medical Park
Group F: Unicaja  80–81  Real Madrid
Group G: EA7 Emporio Armani  57–78  Panathinaikos
Group H:
FC Barcelona Regal  65–60  Bennet Cantù
Žalgiris Kaunas  76–84  Maccabi Tel Aviv

Biathlon
World Cup 6 in Antholz-Anterselva, Italy:
7.5 km Sprint Women:  Magdalena Neuner  20:27.7 (0+1)  Kaisa Mäkäräinen  20:45.2 (0+0)  Darya Domracheva  20:58.2 (2+0)

Cricket
Pakistan vs England in UAE:
1st Test in Dubai:  192 (72.3 overs) & 160 (57.5 overs);  338 (119.5 overs) & 15/0 (3.4 overs). Pakistan win by 10 wickets.

Football (soccer)
CONCACAF Women's Olympic Qualifying Tournament in Vancouver, Canada:
Group A:
 2–0 
 6–0

Freestyle skiing
World Cup in Lake Placid, United States:
Moguls men:  Mikaël Kingsbury  25.32 points  Patrick Deneen  24.00  Philippe Marquis  21.86
Moguls women:  Hannah Kearney  23.52 points  Justine Dufour-Lapointe  22.85  Nikola Sudová  22.78

Handball
European Men's Championship in Serbia (teams in bold advance to the Main Round):
Group A in Belgrade:
 27–26 
 21–21 
Standings: Serbia 5 points, Poland 4, Denmark 2, Slovakia 1.
Group B in Niš:
 29–24 
 21–27 
Standings: Germany 4 points, Macedonia, Sweden 3, Czech Republic 2.
African Men's Championship in Salè, Morocco:
Semifinals:
 26–25 
 28–16 
African Women's Championship in Salé, Morocco:
Semifinals:
 39–19 
 24–27

Multi-sport events
Winter Youth Olympics in Innsbruck, Austria:
Alpine skiing – Boys' giant slalom:  Marco Schwarz  1:51.70  Hannes Zingerle  1:52.10  Sandro Simonet  1:52.33
Biathlon – Mixed relay:   (Franziska Preuß, Laura Hengelhaupt, Maximilian Janke, Niklas Homberg) 1:11:06.8   (Kristin Sandeggen, Karoline Næss, Haakon Livik, Kristian André Aalerud) 1:13:11.7   (Léa Ducordeau, Chloé Chevalier, Fabien Claude, Aristide Bègue) 1:13:27.8
Cross-country skiing – Boys' sprint:  Andreas Molden  1:44.1  Marius Cebulla  +0.6  Alexander Selyaninov  +0.9
Cross-country skiing – Girls' sprint:  Silje Theodorsen  1:57.4  Jonna Sundling  +0.1  Linn Eriksen  +0.1
Ice hockey – Boys' individual skills challenge:  Augusts Valdis Vasiļonoks  22 points  Attila Kovács  21  Seiya Furukawa  19
Ice hockey – Girls' individual skills challenge:  Julie Zwarthoed  22 points  Fanni Gasparics  19  Sharnita Crompton  17
Short track speed skating – Boys' 500 metres:  Yoon Su-Min  42.417  Lim Hyo-Jun  42.482  Xu Hongzhi  42.637
Short track speed skating – Girls' 500 metres:  Shim Suk-Hee  44.122  Xu Aili  44.593  Nicole Martinelli  46.390

Rugby union
Amlin Challenge Cup pool stage Matchday 6 (team in bold advances to the quarterfinals):
Pool 5:
Sale Sharks  9–19  Brive
Agen  62–7  La Vila
Standings: Brive 27 points, Sale Sharks 20, Agen 10, La Vila 0.

Snowboarding
World Cup in Bad Gastein, Austria:
Giant slalom men:  Roland Fischnaller   Aaron March   Rok Flander 
Giant slalom women:  Patrizia Kummer   Julie Zogg   Marion Kreiner 
World Cup in Veysonnaz, Switzerland:
Snowboard cross men:  Andrey Boldykov   Nate Holland   Pierre Vaultier 
Snowboard cross women:  Lindsey Jacobellis   Aleksandra Zhekova   Dominique Maltais

Tennis
Grand Slams:
Australian Open in Melbourne, Australia, day 4:
Men's Singles 2nd Round:
Novak Djokovic  [1] def. Santiago Giraldo  6–3, 6–2, 6–1
Andy Murray  [4] def. Édouard Roger-Vasselin  6–1, 6–4, 6–4
David Ferrer  [5] def. Ryan Sweeting  6–7(4), 6–2, 3–6, 6–2, 6–3
Jo-Wilfried Tsonga  [6] def. Ricardo Mello  7–5, 6–4, 6–4
Janko Tipsarević  [9] def. James Duckworth  3–6, 6–2, 7–6(5), 6–4
Women's Singles 2nd Round:
Petra Kvitová  [2] def. Carla Suárez Navarro  6–2, 2–6, 6–4
Maria Sharapova  [4] def. Jamie Hampton  6–0, 6–1
Vera Zvonareva  [7] def. Lucie Hradecká  6–1, 7–6(3)
Marion Bartoli  [9] def. Jelena Dokić  6–3, 6–2

Water polo
Men's European Championship in Eindhoven, Netherlands:
Group A:
 14–9 
 20–2 
 14–6 
Group B:
 16–10 
 12–15 
 8–11

January 18, 2012 (Wednesday)

Basketball
Euroleague Top 16 matchday 1:
Group E: Olympiacos  78–86  CSKA Moscow
Group F: Montepaschi Siena  81–67  Gescrap Bizkaia
Group G: UNICS Kazan  76–71  Fenerbahçe Ülker

Football (soccer)
OFC Champions League group stage Matchday 3:
Group B: Auckland City  3–2  Amicale

Handball
European Men's Championship in Serbia:
Group C in Novi Sad:
 24–28 
 24–24 
Group D in Vršac:
 29–31 
 34–32 
African Women's Championship in Salé, Morocco:
Quarterfinals:
 19–29 
 41–20 
 23–22 
 24–19

Multi-sport events
Winter Youth Olympics in Innsbruck, Austria:
Alpine skiing – Girls' giant slalom:  Clara Direz  1:56.13  Estelle Alphand  1:56.34  Jasmina Suter  1:56.45
Curling – Mixed team:   (Michael Brunner, Elena Stern, Romano Meier, Lisa Gisler)   (Amos Mosaner, Denise Pimpini, Alessandro Zoppi, Arianna Losano) 1:29.428   (Thomas Scoffin, Corryn Brown, Derek Oryniak, Emily Gray)
Short track speed skating – Boys' 1000 metres:  Lim Hyo-Jun  1:29.284  Yoon Su-Min  1:29.428  Xu Hongzhi  1:29.576
Short track speed skating – Girls' 1000 metres:  Shim Suk-Hee  1:31.661  Xu Aili  1:33.351  Sumire Kikuchi  1:34.254
Speed skating – Boys' 3000 metres:  Yang Fan  4:03.22  Seitaro Ichinohe  4:10.00  Noh Hyeok-Jun  4:14.41
Speed skating – Girls' 3000 metres:  Sanneke de Neeling  4:37.33  Rio Harada  4:41.85  Jang Su-Ji  4:42.72

Tennis
Grand Slams:
Australian Open in Melbourne, Australia, day 3:
Men's Singles 2nd Round:
Rafael Nadal  [2] def. Tommy Haas  6–4, 6–3, 6–4
Roger Federer  [3] def. Andreas Beck  Walkover
Tomáš Berdych  [7] def. Olivier Rochus  6–1, 6–0, 7–6(4)
Alejandro Falla  def. Mardy Fish  [8] 7–6(4), 6–3, 7–6(6)
Nicolás Almagro  [10] def. Grigor Dimitrov  4–6, 6–3, 6–7(4), 6–4, 6–0
Women's Singles 2nd Round:
Caroline Wozniacki  [1] def. Anna Tatishvili  6–1, 7–6(4)
Victoria Azarenka  [3] def. Casey Dellacqua  6–1, 6–0
Li Na  [5] def. Olivia Rogowska  6–2, 6–2
Agnieszka Radwańska  [8] def. Paula Ormaechea  6–3, 6–1
Romina Oprandi  def. Francesca Schiavone  [10] 6–4, 6–3

Water polo
Women's European Championship in Eindhoven, Netherlands:
Group A:
 9–19 
 10–11 
Group B:
 22–12 
 10–9

January 17, 2012 (Tuesday)

Cricket
Sri Lanka in South Africa:
3rd ODI in Bloemfontein:  266/9 (50 overs);  179/5 (34.0 overs). South Africa win by 4 runs (D/L).

Handball
European Men's Championship in Serbia:
Group A in Belgrade:
 24–41 
 24–22 
Group B in Niš:
 23–24 
 29–33 
African Men's Championship in Salè, Morocco:
Quarterfinals:
 31–19 
 31–33 
 26–17 
 22–24

Multi-sport events
Winter Youth Olympics in Innsbruck, Austria:
Alpine skiing – Parallel mixed team:   (Martina Rettenwender, Marco Schwarz, Christina Ager, Mathias Graf)   (Nora Grieg Christensen, Martin Fjeldberg, Mina Fürst Holtmann, Marcus Monsen)   (Estelle Alphand, Victor Schuller, Clara Direz, Leny Herpin)
Cross-country skiing – Girls' 5 kilometre classical:  Anastasia Sedova  14:18.0  Anamarija Lampic  14:37.7  Lea Einfalt  15:01.2
Cross-country skiing – Boys' 10 kilometre classical:  Alexander Selyaninov  14:18.0  Kentaro Ishikawa  14:37.7  Sergey Malyshev  15:01.2
Figure skating – Girls' singles:  Elizaveta Tuktamysheva  173.10 points  Adelina Sotnikova  159.08  Li Zijun  157.70
Figure skating – Ice dancing:  Anna Yanovskaya/Sergey Mozgov  146.96 points  Aleksandra Nazarova/Maxim Nikitin  131.68  Maria Simonova/Dmitri Dragun  125.22
Luge – Mixed team relay:   (Summer Britcher, Tucker West, Ty Andersen/Pat Edmunds) 2:18.310   (Saskia Langer, Christian Paffe, Tim Brendl/Florian Funk) 2:18.708   (Miriam-Stefanie Kastlunger, Armin Frauscher, Tomas Steu/Lorenz Koller) 2:18.863

Tennis
Grand Slams:
Australian Open in Melbourne, Australia, day 2:
Men's Singles 1st Round:
Novak Djokovic  [1] def. Paolo Lorenzi  6–2, 6–0, 6–0
Andy Murray  [4] def. Ryan Harrison  4–6, 6–3, 6–4, 6–2
David Ferrer  [5] def. Rui Machado  6–1, 6–4, 6–2
Jo-Wilfried Tsonga  [6] def. Denis Istomin  6–4, 3–6, 6–2, 7–5
Janko Tipsarević  [9] def. Dmitry Tursunov  5–7, 7–6(12), 6–3, 6–4
Women's Singles 1st Round:
Petra Kvitová  [2] def. Vera Dushevina  6–2, 6–0
Maria Sharapova  [4] def. Gisela Dulko  6–0, 6–1
Sorana Cîrstea  def. Samantha Stosur  [6] 7–6(2), 6–3
Vera Zvonareva  [7] def. Alexandra Dulgheru  7–6(4), 6–7(5), 6–3
Marion Bartoli  [9] def. Virginie Razzano  7–5, 6–0

Water polo
Men's European Championship in Eindhoven, Netherlands:
Group A:
 6–10 
 6–19 
 7–24 
Group B:
 13–12 
 12–10 
 8–10

January 16, 2012 (Monday)

Handball
European Men's Championship in Serbia:
Group C in Novi Sad:
 26–29 
 31–31 
Group D in Vršac:
 28–27 
 31–29 
African Men's Championship in Salè, Morocco (teams in bold advance to the quarterfinals):
Group A:
 19–33 
 24–20 
 32–20 
Standings: Tunisia 10 points, Morocco 8, DR Congo 6, Senegal 4, Congo 2, Gabon 0.
Group B:
 32–25 
 35–13 
 34–34 
Standings: Egypt, Algeria 9 points, Angola 6, Cameroon 4, Côte d'Ivoire 2, Burkina Faso 0.
African Women's Championship in Salé, Morocco (teams in bold advance to the quarterfinals):
Group A:
 28–28 
 23–36 
Standings: Angola 8 points, DR Congo,  4, Côte d'Ivoire 3, Egypt 1.
Group B:
 20–23 
 30–32 
Standings: Tunisia 8 points, Algeria 6, Congo 4, Senegal 2, Morocco 0.

Multi-sport events
Winter Youth Olympics in Innsbruck, Austria:
Biathlon – Boys' pursuit:  Niklas Homberg  28:43.1  Rene Zahkna  28:52.6  Cheng Fangming  28:57.7
Biathlon – Girls' pursuit:  Uliana Kaysheva  26:01.3  Franziska Preuß  26:29.2  Galina Vishnevskaya  27:44.4
Figure skating – Boys:  Han Yan  192.45 points  Shoma Uno  167.15  Feodosiy Efremenkov  163.46
Figure skating – Pairs:  Yu Xiaoyu/Jin Yang  153.82 points  Lina Fedorova/Maxim Miroshkin  134.19  Anastasia Dolidze/Vadim Ivanov  112.72
Luge – Girls' singles:  Miriam-Stefanie Kastlunger  1:20.197  Saskia Langer  1:20.414  Ulla Zirne  1:20.479
Luge – Doubles:  Florian gruber/Simon Kainzwaldner  1:25.194  Tim Brendl/Florian Funk  1:25.358  Ty Andersen/Pat Edmunds  1:25.766
Speed skating – Boys' 1500 metres:  Yang Fan  1:54.20  Liu An  2:00.28  Seitaro Ichinohe  2:00.30
Speed skating – Girls' 1500 metres:  Jang Mi  2:08.17  Sanneke de Neeling  2:09.54  Sumire Kikuchi  2:11.33

Tennis
Grand Slams:
Australian Open in Melbourne, Australia, day 1:
Men's Singles 1st Round:
Rafael Nadal  [2] def. Alex Kuznetsov  6–4, 6–1, 6–1
Roger Federer  [3] def. Alexander Kudryavtsev  7–5, 6–2, 6–2
Tomáš Berdych  [7] def. Albert Ramos  7–5, 4–6, 6–2, 6–3
Mardy Fish  [8] def. Gilles Müller  6–4, 6–4, 6–2
Nicolás Almagro  [10] def. Łukasz Kubot  1–6, 7–5, 6–3, 7–5
Women's Singles 1st Round:
Caroline Wozniacki  [1] def. Anastasia Rodionova  6–2, 6–1
Victoria Azarenka  [3] def. Heather Watson  6–1, 6–0
Li Na  [5] def. Xeniya Pervak  6–3, 6–1
Agnieszka Radwańska  [8] def. Bethanie Mattek-Sands  6–7(10), 6–4, 6–2
Francesca Schiavone  [10] def. Laura Pous Tió  6–1, 6–3

Water polo
Men's European Championship in Eindhoven, Netherlands:
Group A:
 16–4 
 14–12 
 12–8 
Group B:
 10–7 
 7–13 
 8–5

January 15, 2012 (Sunday)

Alpine skiing
Men's World Cup in Wengen, Switzerland:
Slalom:  Ivica Kostelić  1:45.67  André Myhrer  1:46.52  Fritz Dopfer  1:46.55
Women's World Cup in Cortina d'Ampezzo, Italy:
Super Giant Slalom:  Lindsey Vonn  1:26.16  Maria Höfl-Riesch  1:26.77  Tina Maze  1:27.02

American football
NFL playoffs:
Divisional Playoffs:
AFC: Baltimore Ravens 20, Houston Texans 13
NFC: New York Giants 37, Green Bay Packers 20
Eli Manning throws three touchdowns to secure the Giants victory, thus for the seventh year in a row the NFL will crown a new Champion.

Auto racing
Dakar Rally in Argentina, Chile and Peru:
Bikes:  Cyril Despres  (KTM) 43:28:11  Marc Coma  (KTM) 44:21:31  Hélder Rodrigues  (Yamaha) 44:39:28
Despres wins the event for the fourth time.
Cars:  Stéphane Peterhansel/Jean Paul Cottret  (Mini) 38:54:46  Joan Roma /Michel Périn  (Mini) 39:36:42  Giniel de Villiers /Dirk von Zitzewitz  (Toyota) 40:08:11
Peterhansel wins the event for the third time and sixth overall.
Trucks:  Gérard de Rooy /Dariusz Rodewald /Tom Cosoul  (Iveco) 45:20:47  Hans Stacey/Hans Van Goor/Bernard der Kinderen  (Iveco) 46:12:06  Artur Ardavichus /Alexey Kuzmich /Nurlan Turlubaev  (Kamaz) 47:08:32
de Rooy wins the event for the first time.
All-terrain vehicles (quads) (all ARG):  Alejandro Patronelli (Yamaha) 53:01:47  Marcos Patronelli (Yamaha) 54:22:08  Tomas Maffei (Yamaha) 55:16:12
Patronelli wins the event for the second successive time.

Biathlon
World Cup 5 in Nové Město, Czech Republic:
10 km Pursuit Women:  Tora Berger  31:00.3 (0+1+2+0)  Helena Ekholm  31:18.2 (0+0+0+0)  Marie Laure Brunet  31:25.4 (0+0+0+0)
12.5 km Pursuit Men:  Anton Shipulin  34:50.8 (0+0+1+0)  Martin Fourcade  & Arnd Peiffer  35:01.9 (1+0+1+1)

Bobsleigh
World Cup in Königssee, Germany:
Four-man:   (Alexandr Zubkov, Filipp Yegorov, Dmitry Trunenkov, Maxim Mokrousov) 1:38.05 (49.22, 48.83)   (Manuel Machata, Marko Huebenbecker, Andreas Bredau, Christian Poser) 1:38.07 (49.24, 48.83)   (Maximilian Arndt, Jan Speer, Alexander Rödiger, Martin Putze) 1:38.19 (49.30, 48.89)

Cricket
India in Australia:
3rd Test in Perth:  161 (60.2 overs) & 171 (63.2 overs);  369 (76.2 overs). Australia win by an innings and 37 runs.

Cross-country skiing
World Cup in Milan, Italy:
Team Sprint Freestyle men:  Alexey Petukhov/Nikolay Morilov  14:34.8  Calle Halfvarsson/Teodor Peterson  14:35.0  David Hofer/Fulvio Scola  14:35.4
Team Sprint Freestyle women:  Hanna Brodin/Ida Ingemarsdotter  16:14.7  Jessie Diggins/Kikkan Randall  16:15.6  Perianne Jones/Chandra Crawford  16:15.8

Darts
BDO World Darts Championship in Frimley Green, England:
Men's final: Tony O'Shea  5–7 Christian Kist

Freestyle skiing
World Cup in Les Contamines, France:
Ski Cross men:  Alex Fiva   Didrik Bastian Juell   Nick Zoricic 
Ski Cross women:  Sanna Lüdi   Alizée Baron   Ophélie David

Handball
European Men's Championship in Serbia:
Group A in Belgrade:
 18–22 
 30–25 
Group B in Niš:
 24–27 
 26–26 
African Men's Championship in Salè, Morocco:
Group A:
 33–26 
 35–31 
 18–26 
Group B:
 15–30 
 34–20 
 14–23 
African Women's Championship in Salé, Morocco:
Group A:
 40–15 
 19–26 
Group B:
 26–22 
 31–7

Luge
World Cup 5 in Oberhof, Germany (GER unless stated):
Men:  Felix Loch 1:28.042 (43.921, 44.121)  David Möller 1:28.251 (44.100, 44.151)  Andi Langenhan 1:28.331 (44.152, 44.179)
Team relay:   (Natalie Geisenberger, Loch, Toni Eggert/Sascha Benecken) 2:24.768 (46.704, 48.786, 49.278)   (Sandra Gasparini, David Mair, Christian Oberstolz/Patrick Gruber) 2:26.061 (47.464, 49.203, 49.394)   (Alexandra Rodionova, Viktor Kneib, Vladislav Yuzhakov/Vladimir Makhnutin) 2:26.142 (47.349, 49.384, 49.409)

Multi-sport events
Winter Youth Olympics in Innsbruck, Austria:
Alpine skiing – Boys' combined:  Marco Schwarz  1:40.45  Miha Hrobat  1:41.12  Sandro Simonet  1.41:45
Alpine skiing – Girls' combined:  Magdalena Fjällström  1:40.82  Estelle Alphand  1:41.41  Adriana Jelinkova  1:42.21
Biathlon – Boys' sprint:  Cheng Fangming  19:21.7  Rene Zahkna  19:43.0  Aristide Begue  19:48.5
Biathlon – Girls' sprint:  Franziska Preuß  17:27.7  Galina Vishnevskaya  17:55.2  Uliana Kaysheva  18:00.9
Freestyle skiing – Boys' halfpipe:  Kai Mahler  95.00  Lauri Kivari  90.00  Aaron Blunck  87.50
Freestyle skiing – Girls' halfpipe:  Elisabeth Gram  84.75  Tiril Sjaastad Christiansen  79.25  Marine Tripier Mondancin  69.50
Luge – Boys' singles:  Christian Paffe  1:19.603  Riks Kristens Rozitis  1:19.806  Toni Graefe  1:19.920
Nordic combined – Individual:  Tomas Portyk  26:31.4  Ilkka Herola  26:34.2  Go Yamamoto  26:39.9
Snowboarding – Boys' halfpipe:  Ben Ferguson  93.25  Tim-Kevin Ravnjak  86.75  Taku Hiraoka  84.25
Snowboarding – Girls' halfpipe:  Hikaru Ohe  96.25  Arielle Gold  90.00  Lucile Lefevre  82.25

Nordic combined
World Cup in Chaux-Neuve, France:
HS 117 / 10 km:  Alessandro Pittin  22:18.1  Jørgen Graabak  22:34.6  Mikko Kokslien  22:35.6

Rugby union
Heineken Cup pool stage Matchday 5:
Pool 3: Glasgow Warriors  16–23  Leinster
Pool 5: Saracens  20–16  Biarritz
Amlin Challenge Cup pool stage Matchday 5:
Pool 2:
Newcastle Falcons  43–0  Petrarca Padova
Toulon  29–10  Lyon

Ski jumping
Men's World Cup in Tauplitz, Austria:
HS 200 (Ski flying):
First event:  Robert Kranjec  212.5 points  Thomas Morgenstern  206.8  Anders Bardal  201.6
Second event:  Bardal 364.9 points  Daiki Ito  363.3  Kamil Stoch  358.2
Women's World Cup in Val di Fiemme, Italy:
HS 106:  Sarah Hendrickson  285.9 points  Daniela Iraschko  273.1  Ulrike Gräßler  250.8

Snowboarding
World Cup in Bad Gastein, Austria:
Snowboard Cross: Cancelled due to lack of snow, rescheduled to January 19 in Veysonnaz, Switzerland.

Tennis
ATP World Tour:
Apia International in Sydney, Australia:
Final: Jarkko Nieminen  def. Julien Benneteau  6–2, 7–5
Nieminen wins the second title of his career.

January 14, 2012 (Saturday)

Alpine skiing
Men's World Cup in Wengen, Switzerland:
Downhill:  Beat Feuz  2:35.31  Hannes Reichelt  2:35.75  Christof Innerhofer  2:35.80
Women's World Cup in Cortina d'Ampezzo, Italy:
Downhill:  Daniela Merighetti  1:33.17  Lindsey Vonn  1:33.38  Maria Höfl-Riesch  1:33.57

American football
NFL playoffs:
Divisional Playoffs:
NFC: San Francisco 49ers 36, New Orleans Saints 32
AFC: New England Patriots 45, Denver Broncos 10

Biathlon
World Cup 5 in Nové Město, Czech Republic:
10 km Sprint Men:  Emil Hegle Svendsen  27:13.1 (0+1)  Simon Fourcade  27:15.8 (1+2)  Martin Fourcade  27:22.7 (1+1)

Bobsleigh
World Cup in Königssee, Germany:
Two-man:  Beat Hefti/Thomas Lamparter  1:39.91 (50.04, 49.87)  Lyndon Rush/Jesse Lumsden  1:40.21 (50.23, 49.98)  Manuel Machata/Andreas Bredau  1:40.33 (50.34, 49.99)

Cricket
Sri Lanka in South Africa:
2nd ODI in East London:  236/6 (50 overs);  237/5 (48.4 overs). South Africa win by 5 wickets.

Cross-country skiing
World Cup in Milan, Italy:
Sprint Freestyle men:  Eirik Brandsdal   Josef Wenzl   Teodor Peterson 
Sprint Freestyle women:  Ida Ingemarsdotter   Kikkan Randall   Maiken Caspersen Falla

Freestyle skiing
World Cup in Mont Gabriel, Canada:
Dual Moguls men:  Mikaël Kingsbury   Jeremy Cota   Sergey Volkov 
Dual Moguls women:  Hannah Kearney   Justine Dufour-Lapointe   Ekaterina Stolyarova

Luge
World Cup 5 in Oberhof, Germany (GER unless stated):
Doubles:  Toni Eggert/Sascha Benecken 1:23.544 (41.765, 41.779)  Tobias Wendl/Tobias Arlt 1:23.775 (41.824, 41.951)  Andreas Linger/Wolfgang Linger  1:24.199 (42.068, 42.131)
Women:  Natalie Geisenberger 1:24.443 (42.393, 42.050)  Tatjana Hüfner 1:24.690 (42.639, 42.051)  Anke Wischnewski 1:25.107 (42.681, 42.426)

Mixed martial arts
UFC 142 in Rio de Janeiro, Brazil:
Lightweight bout: Edson Barboza  def. Terry Etim  via KO (spinning wheel kick)
Welterweight bout: Carlo Prater  def. Erick Silva  via disqualification (illegal blows to back of head)
Middleweight bout: Rousimar Palhares  def. Mike Massenzio  via submission (heel hook)
Catchweight (197 lb) bout: Vitor Belfort  def. Anthony Johnson  via submission (rear-naked choke)
Featherweight Championship bout: José Aldo  (c) def. Chad Mendes  via KO (knee)

Multi-sport events
Winter Youth Olympics in Innsbruck, Austria:
Alpine skiing – Boys' Super-G:  Adam Lamhamedi  1:04.45  Fredrik Bauer  1:04.57  Joan Verdu Sanchez  1:04.65
Lamhamedi becomes the first African winner of a Winter Olympic event medal, while Sanchez wins Andorra's first ever Olympic medal.
Alpine skiing – Girls' Super-G:  Estelle Alphand  1:05.78  Nora Grieg Christensen  1:05.79  Christina Ager  1:06.06
Ski jumping – Boys' individual:  Anže Lanišek  286.1 points  Mats S. Berggaard  277.8  Yukiya Sato  260.1
Ski jumping – Girls' individual:  Sara Takanashi  269.3 points  Katharina Althaus  242.5  Urša Bogataj  239.3
Speed skating – Boys' 500 metres:  Liu An  75.50  Roman Dubovik  77.824  Toshihiro Kakui  77.827
Speed skating – Girls' 500 metres:  Jang Mi  81.68  Shi Xiaoxuan  84.32  Martine Lilloy Bruun  87.51

Nordic combined
World Cup in Chaux-Neuve, France:
HS 117 / 10 km:  Alessandro Pittin  22:48.6  Jason Lamy-Chappuis  22:48.6  Fabian Riessle  22:48.7

Rugby union
Heineken Cup pool stage Matchday 5:
Pool 1:
Scarlets  17–29  Northampton Saints
Munster  26–10  Castres
Pool 2: London Irish  15–22  Cardiff Blues
Pool 3: Montpellier  24–22  Bath
Pool 4: Aironi  0–82  Clermont
Pool 6:
Toulouse  24–3  Connacht
Harlequins  20–14  Gloucester
Amlin Challenge Cup pool stage Matchday 5:
Pool 1:
București Wolves  13–34  Stade Français
Worcester Warriors  55–10  Crociati Parma
Pool 3: Rovigo  11–32  London Wasps
Pool 4:
Cavalieri Prato  10–50  Exeter Chiefs
Perpignan  27–13  Newport Gwent Dragons
Pool 5: La Vila  10–69  Sale Sharks

Skeleton
World Cup in Königssee, Germany:
Men:  Frank Rommel  1:42.94 (51.23, 51.71)  Alexander Kröckel  1:43.76 (52.11, 51.65)  Matthias Guggenberger  1:43.86 (51.97, 51.89)

Ski jumping
Women's World Cup in Val di Fiemme, Italy:
HS 106:  Sarah Hendrickson  277.2 points  Daniela Iraschko  275.5  Anette Sagen  248.1

Snooker
Marco Fu  compiles the 86th official maximum break in the qualifying stages of the World Open, and becomes the 14th player to make multiple maximum breaks.

Tennis
ATP World Tour:
Apia International in Sydney, Australia:
Final: Julien Benneteau  vs. Jarkko Nieminen  – Cancelled and rescheduled to Sunday.
Heineken Open in Auckland, New Zealand:
Final: David Ferrer  def. Olivier Rochus  6–3, 6–4
Ferrer wins the 12th title of his career, and his 3rd title at Auckland, also winning in 2007 and 2011.
WTA Tour:
Moorilla Hobart International in Hobart, Australia:
Final: Mona Barthel  def. Yanina Wickmayer  6–1, 6–2
Barthel wins the first WTA title of her career.

January 13, 2012 (Friday)

Alpine skiing
Men's World Cup in Wengen, Switzerland:
Super combined:  Ivica Kostelic  2:42.16 (1:53.41, 48.75)  Beat Feuz  2:42.36 (1:50.45, 51.91)  Bode Miller  2:42.61 (1:51.23, 51.38)

Biathlon
World Cup 5 in Nové Město, Czech Republic:
7.5 km Sprint Women:  Olga Zaitseva  23:08.1 (0+0)  Tora Berger  23:33.6 (1+1)  Magdalena Neuner  23:42.6 (0+3)

Bobsleigh
World Cup in Königssee, Germany:
Women:  Cathleen Martini/Berit Wiacker  1:43.56 (51.86, 51.70)  Kaillie Humphries/Emily Baadsvik  1:44.10 (52.34, 51.76)  Fabienne Meyer/Hanne Schenk  1:44.10 (52.35, 51.75)

Darts
BDO World Darts Championship in Frimley Green, England:
Women's final: Deta Hedman  1–2 Anastasia Dobromyslova 
Dobromyslova wins the title for the second time.

Handball
African Men's Championship in Salè, Morocco:
Group A:
 20–21 
 30–21 
 17–25 
Group B:
 32–18 
 32–19 
 21–15 
African Women's Championship in Salé, Morocco:
Group A:
 23–23 
 18–24 
Group B:
 28–23 
 8–35

Nordic combined
World Cup in Chaux-Neuve, France:
HS 117 / 10 km:  Alessandro Pittin  22:29.6  Jason Lamy-Chappuis  22:34.0  Fabian Riessle  22:35.6

Rugby union
Heineken Cup pool stage Matchday 5:
Pool 2: Racing Métro  24–27  Edinburgh
Pool 4: Ulster  41–7  Leicester Tigers
Pool 5: Ospreys  44–17  Benetton Treviso
Amlin Challenge Cup pool stage Matchday 5:
Pool 5: Brive  50–13  Agen

Skeleton
World Cup in Königssee, Germany:
Women:  Shelley Rudman  1:46.15 (53.26, 52.89)  Marion Thees  1:46.65 (53.41, 53.24)  Mellisa Hollingsworth  1:47.19 (53.77, 53.42)

Snowboarding
World Cup in Jauerling, Austria:
Slalom men:  Andreas Prommegger   Andrey Sobolev   Roland Fischnaller 
Slalom women:  Patrizia Kummer   Yekaterina Tudegesheva   Marion Kreiner

Tennis
WTA Tour:
Apia International in Sydney, Australia:
Final: Victoria Azarenka  def. Li Na  6–2, 1–6, 6–3
Azarenka wins her ninth career title.

January 12, 2012 (Thursday)

Biathlon
World Cup 5 in Nové Město, Czech Republic:
20 km Individual Men:  Andrei Makoveev  47:19.0 (0+0+0+0)  Emil Hegle Svendsen  48:18.7 (1+0+0+1)  Björn Ferry  48:33.8 (0+0+0+1)

Handball
African Men's Championship in Salè, Morocco:
Group A:
 20–25 
 26–31 
 15–32 
Group B:
 21–40 
 7–30 
 18–27 
African Women's Championship in Salé, Morocco:
Group A:
 25–23 
 24–27 
Group B:
 25–17 
 16–34

Rugby union
Amlin Challenge Cup pool stage Matchday 5:
Pool 3: Bordeaux Bègles  6–12  Bayonne

Snooker
Championship League Group two in Stock, England:
Final (both ENG): Mark Selby 0–3 Shaun Murphy
Murphy advances to the winners group.

January 11, 2012 (Wednesday)

Biathlon
World Cup 5 in Nové Město, Czech Republic:
15 km Individual Women:  Kaisa Mäkäräinen  45:03.3 (0+1+1+0)  Helena Ekholm  45:25.3 (0+0+0+1)  Magdalena Neuner  45:36.2 (0+1+0+1)

Cricket
Sri Lanka in South Africa:
1st ODI in Paarl:  301/8 (50 overs);  43 (20.1 overs). South Africa won by 258 runs.

Freestyle skiing
World Cup in Alpe D'Huez, France:
Ski Cross men:  Filip Flisar   Christopher Del Bosco   Lars Lewen 
Ski Cross women:  Sanna Lüdi   Marielle Thompson   Andrea Limbacher

Handball
African Men's Championship in Salé, Morocco:
Group A:
 26–21 
 35–18 
 28–24 
Group B:
 25–14 
 27–17 
 33–16 
African Women's Championship in Salé, Morocco:
Group A:
 28–16 
 24–26 
Group B:
 29–17 
 25–15

January 10, 2012 (Tuesday)

Snooker
Championship League – Group one in Stock, England:
Final (both ENG): Judd Trump 3–2 Shaun Murphy
Trump advances to the winners group.

January 9, 2012 (Monday)

American football
NCAA bowl games:
BCS National Championship Game in New Orleans: Alabama 21, LSU 0
Jeremy Shelley kicks five field goals as the Crimson Tide win their 14th national title; they also become unanimous champions, as the Associated Press also names Alabama their national champions.

January 8, 2012 (Sunday)

Alpine skiing
Men's World Cup in Adelboden, Switzerland:
Slalom:  Marcel Hirscher  1:58.66  Ivica Kostelić  1:58.93  Stefano Gross  1:59.65
Women's World Cup in Bad Kleinkirchheim, Austria:
Super Giant Slalom:  Fabienne Suter  1:09.55  Tina Maze  1:09.89  Anna Fenninger  1:10.29

American football
NFL playoffs:
Wild Card Playoffs:
NFC: New York Giants 24, Atlanta Falcons 2
AFC: Denver Broncos 29, Pittsburgh Steelers 23 (OT)

Biathlon
World Cup 4 in Oberhof, Germany:
12.5 km Mass Start Women:  Magdalena Neuner  40:02.2 (1+1+1+0)  Tora Berger  40:14.7 (1+0+1+0)  Andrea Henkel  40:34.2 (1+0+0+0)
15 km Mass Start Men:  Andreas Birnbacher  38:34.6 (0+0+0+0)  Simon Fourcade  38:38.9 (0+1+0+0)  Emil Hegle Svendsen  39:04.2 (0+1+2+0)

Bobsleigh
World Cup in Altenberg, Germany:
4-man:   (Maximilian Arndt, Marko Huebenbecker, Alexander Rödiger, Martin Putze) 1:49.87 (54.73, 55.14)   (Alexandr Zubkov, Filipp Yegorov, Dmitry Trunenkov, Nikolay Hrenkov) 1:50.53 (55.16, 55.37)   (Thomas Florschütz, Ronny Listner, Kevin Kuske, Thomas Blaschek) 1:50.79 (55.17, 55.62)

Cross-country skiing
Tour de Ski:
Stage 9 in Val di Fiemme, Italy:
Men's 9 km Freestyle Final Climb:  Alexander Legkov  30:38.2  Maurice Manificat  +0.1  Marcus Hellner  +1.7
Tour de Ski final standings:  Dario Cologna  4:33:17.2  Hellner +1:02.3  Petter Northug  +1:44.6
Cologna wins the Tour de Ski for the third time.
Women's 9 km Freestyle Final Climb:  Therese Johaug  34:17.7  Justyna Kowalczyk  +51.3  Marit Bjørgen  +1:08.0
Tour de Ski final standings:  Kowalczyk 2:52:45.0  Bjørgen +28.2  Johaug +3:57.8
Kowalczyk wins the Tour de Ski for the third successive time.

Nordic combined
World Cup in Oberstdorf, Germany:
HS 106 / 10 km:  Mikko Kokslien  26:06.5  Magnus Moan  26:07.0  Björn Kircheisen  26:07.7

Ski jumping
Women's World Cup in Hinterzarten, Germany:
HS 108:  Sarah Hendrickson  273.2 points  Sara Takanashi  242.6  Jessica Jerome  240.1

Snooker
Players Tour Championship – Event 12 in Fürstenfeldbruck, Germany (ENG unless stated):
Final: Joe Perry 2–4 Stephen Maguire 
Maguire wins his sixth professional title.
Final Order of Merit: (1) Judd Trump 30,400 (2) Ronnie O'Sullivan 29,600 (3) Neil Robertson  28,100

Speed skating
European Championships in Budapest, Hungary:
5000 m Ladies:  Martina Sáblíková  7:22.38  Claudia Pechstein  7:34.51  Ireen Wüst  7:43.59
1500 m Men:  Sven Kramer  1:53.98  Sverre Lunde Pedersen  1:54.87  Jan Blokhuijsen  1:54.93
10000 m Men:  Kramer 13:45.05  Blokhuijsen 13:52.48  Håvard Bøkko  14:02.83
Overall Ladies:  Sáblíková 169.922 points  Pechstein 172.312  Wüst 172.454
Sáblíková wins the title for the third successive time and fourth time overall.
Overall Men:  Kramer 156.197 points  Blokhuijsen 156.513  Bøkko 158.234
Kramer wins the title for the fifth time.

Tennis
ATP World Tour:
Brisbane International in Brisbane, Australia:
Final: Andy Murray  def. Alexandr Dolgopolov  6–1, 6–3
Murray wins his 22nd career title.
Aircel Chennai Open in Chennai, India:
Final: Milos Raonic  def. Janko Tipsarević   6–7(4), 7–6(4), 7–6(4)
Raonic wins his second career title.
WTA Tour:
ASB Classic in Auckland, New Zealand:
Final: Zheng Jie  def. Flavia Pennetta  2–6, 6–3, 2–0 retired
Zheng wins her fourth career title.

January 7, 2012 (Saturday)

Alpine skiing
Men's World Cup in Adelboden, Switzerland:
Giant slalom:  Marcel Hirscher  2:42.50  Benjamin Raich  2:42.58  Massimiliano Blardone  2:42.60
Women's World Cup in Bad Kleinkirchheim, Austria:
Downhill:  Elisabeth Görgl  1:48.40  Julia Mancuso  1:48.56  Fabienne Suter  1:48.90

American football
NFL playoffs:
Wild Card Playoffs:
AFC: Houston Texans 31, Cincinnati Bengals 10
NFC: New Orleans Saints 45, Detroit Lions 28

Biathlon
World Cup 4 in Oberhof, Germany:
10 km Sprint Men:  Arnd Peiffer  25:57.5 (1+0)  Simon Fourcade  25:58.6 (0+0)  Evgeny Ustyugov  26:02.3 (0+0)

Bobsleigh
World Cup in Altenberg, Germany:
2-man:  Thomas Florschütz/Kevin Kuske  56.26  Maximilian Arndt/Marko Huebenbecker  56.27  Beat Hefti/Thomas Lamparter  56.73

Cross-country skiing
Tour de Ski:
Stage 8 in Val di Fiemme, Italy:
Men's 20 km Classic Mass Start:  Eldar Rønning  1:00:02.2  Alex Harvey  +1.1  Dario Cologna  +1.3
Women's 10 km Classic Mass Start:  Justyna Kowalczyk  25:49.8  Marit Bjørgen  +7.5  Charlotte Kalla  +31.0

Freestyle skiing
World Cup in St. Johann, Austria:
Ski Cross men:  Alex Fiva   Brady Leman   Daniel Bohnacker 
Ski Cross women:  Ophélie David   Anna Woerner   Alizée Baron

Ice hockey
World Women's U18 Championship in Zlín, Czech Republic:
Bronze medal game:   4–1 
Final:   0–3  
Canada win the title for the second time.

Mixed martial arts
Strikeforce: Rockhold vs. Jardine in Las Vegas, United States:
Welterweight bout: Tarec Saffiedine  def. Tyler Stinson  via split decision (28–29, 30–27, 29–28)
Welterweight bout: Tyron Woodley  def. Jordan Mein  via split decision (28–29, 29–28, 30–27)
Light Heavyweight bout: Muhammed Lawal  def. Lorenz Larkin  via KO (punches)
Middleweight bout: Robbie Lawler  def. Adlan Amagov  via TKO (flying knee and punches)
Middleweight Championship bout: Luke Rockhold  (c) def. Keith Jardine  via TKO (punches)

Nordic combined
World Cup in Oberstdorf, Germany:
HS 106 / Team:   (Magnus Moan, Mikko Kokslien, Jan Schmid, Joergen Graabak) 51:36.7   (Johannes Rydzek, Fabian Riessle, Eric Frenzel, Tino Edelmann) 51:36.8   (Wilhelm Denifl, Christoph Bieler, Mario Stecher, Bernhard Gruber) 51:42.8

Skeleton
World Cup in Altenberg, Germany:
Women:  Anja Huber  59.87  Katharina Heinz  59.97  Shelley Rudman  59.99

Ski jumping
Women's World Cup in Hinterzarten, Germany:
HS 108:  Sabrina Windmüller  114.7 points  Lindsey Van  113.9  Lisa Demetz  110.7

Speed skating
European Championships in Budapest, Hungary:
500 m Men:  Konrad Niedźwiedzki  36.89  Zbigniew Bródka  36.90  Jan Blokhuijsen  36.93
1500 m Ladies:  Martina Sáblíková  2:03.64  Linda de Vries  2:04.70  Yuliya Skokova  2:05.18
5000 m Men:  Sven Kramer  6:31.82  Jan Blokhuijsen  6:36.49  Alexis Contin  6:38.08

Tennis
ATP World Tour:
Qatar Open in Doha, Qatar:
Final: Jo-Wilfried Tsonga  def. Gaël Monfils  7–5, 6–3
Tsonga wins his eighth career title.
WTA Tour:
Brisbane International in Brisbane, Australia:
Final: Kaia Kanepi  def. Daniela Hantuchová  6–2, 6–1
Kanepi wins her second career title.
Hopman Cup in Perth, Australia:
Final: Czech Republic  2–0  France
Petra Kvitová  def. Marion Bartoli  7–5, 6–1
Tomáš Berdych  def. Richard Gasquet  7–6(0), 6–4
Czech Republic win the Cup for the second time.

January 6, 2012 (Friday)

Biathlon
World Cup 4 in Oberhof, Germany:
7.5 km Sprint Women:  Magdalena Neuner  22:27.6 (0+0)  Darya Domracheva  23:04.9 (0+1)  Olga Zaitseva  23:11.0 (0+0)

Bobsleigh
World Cup in Altenberg, Germany:
Women:  Cathleen Martini/Janine Tischer  1:54.67 (57.45, 57.22)  Sandra Kiriasis/Petra Lammert  1:54.69 (57.49, 57.20)  Fabienne Meyer/Hanne Schenk  1:55.23 (57.69, 57.54)

Cricket
Sri Lanka in South Africa:
3rd Test in Cape Town:  580/4d (139 Overs) & 2/0 (0.0 overs);  239 (73.5 Overs) & 342 (f/o, 107.5 Overs). South Africa win by 10 wickets, South Africa win the 3-match series 2–1. 
India in Australia:
2nd Test in Sydney:  191 (59.3 Overs) & 400 (110.5 overs);  659/4d (163 Overs). Australia win by an innings and 68 runs, Australia lead the 4-match series 2–0. 
Michael Clarke's 329 not out is the highest score at the SCG and third-highest by an Australian captain in Test cricket.

Ice hockey
World Women's U18 Championship in Zlín, Czech Republic, semifinals:
 7–1 
 7–0

Luge
World Cup 4 in Königssee, Germany (GER unless stated):
Men:  Felix Loch 1:41.651 (50.878, 50.773)  Armin Zöggeler  1:41.868 (51.116, 50.752)  Johannes Ludwig 1:42.142 (51.218, 50.924)
Team relay:   (Sandra Gasparini, Dominik Fischnaller, Christian Oberstolz/Patrick Gruber) 2:51.375 (56.115, 57.860, 57.400)   (Tatjana Hüfner, Loch, Tobias Arlt/Tobias Wendl 2:51.531 (55.902, 57.674, 57.955)   (Tatiana Ivanova, Albert Demtschenko, Vladislav Yuzhakov/Vladimir Makhnutin) 2:51.776 (55.681, 58.010, 58.085)

Skeleton
World Cup in Altenberg, Germany:
Men:  Martins Dukurs  1:54.15 (51.23, 51.71)  Tomass Dukurs  1:55.22 (52.11, 51.65)  Alexander Kröckel  1:55.82 (51.97, 51.89)

Ski jumping
Four Hills Tournament:
Stage 4 in Bischofshofen, Austria:
HS 140:  Thomas Morgenstern  138.7 points  Anders Bardal  136.5  Gregor Schlierenzauer  128.4
Four Hills Tournament final standings:  Schlierenzauer 933.8 points  Morgenstern 908.0  Andreas Kofler  896.6
Schlierenzauer wins the tournament for the first time.
Women's World Cup in Schonach, Germany:
HS 108: Cancelled due to rain and warm temperatures; rescheduled to 7 January in Hinterzarten

Speed skating
European Championships in Budapest, Hungary:
500 m Ladies:  Karolína Erbanová  39.87  Ireen Wüst  40.21  Yuliya Skokova  40.40
3000 m Ladies:  Martina Sáblíková  4:16.09  Natalia Czerwonka  4:19.41  Claudia Pechstein  4:19.71

January 5, 2012 (Thursday)

Alpine skiing
Men's World Cup in Zagreb, Croatia:
Slalom:  Marcel Hirscher  1:51.84  Felix Neureuther  1:52.13  Ivica Kostelić  1:52.32

Biathlon
World Cup 4 in Oberhof, Germany:
4x7.5 km Relay Men:   (Christian de Lorenzi, Markus Windisch, Dominik Windisch, Lukas Hofer) 1:30:49.1 (0+4)   (Anton Shipulin, Evgeniy Garanichev, Evgeny Ustyugov, Alexey Volkov) 1:30:55.2 (2+9)   (Tobias Arwidson, Björn Ferry, Fredrik Lindström, Carl Johan Bergman) 1:31:21.8 (0+3)

Cross-country skiing
Tour de Ski:
Stage 7 in Cortina d'Ampezzo–Toblach, Italy:
Men's 32 km Freestyle Handicap Start:  Dario Cologna  1:09:25.2  Petter Northug  +1:15.8  Alexander Legkov  +1:16.4
Women's 15 km Freestyle Handicap Start:  Marit Bjørgen  39:01.1  Justyna Kowalczyk  +2.0  Therese Johaug  +3:16.9

Ice hockey
World Junior Championship in Calgary, Canada:
Bronze medal game:   4–0 
Final:   1–0 (OT)  
Sweden win the title for the second time.

Luge
World Cup 4 in Königssee, Germany (GER unless stated):
Doubles:  Tobias Wendl/Tobias Arlt 1:41.172 (50.498, 50.674)  Andreas Linger/Wolfgang Linger  1:41.406 (50.515, 50.891)  Toni Eggert/Sascha Benecken 1:41.829 (50.958, 50.871)
Women:  Tatjana Hüfner 1:41.900 (51.076, 50.824)  Natalie Geisenberger 1:42.074 (50.860, 51.214)  Alex Gough  1:42.630 (51.431, 51.199)

January 4, 2012 (Wednesday)

American football
NCAA bowl games:
Orange Bowl in Miami Gardens, Florida: West Virginia 70, Clemson 33

Biathlon
World Cup 4 in Oberhof, Germany:
4x6 km Relay Women:   (Anna Bogaliy-Titovets, Svetlana Sleptsova, Olga Zaitseva, Olga Vilukhina) 1:19:32.0 (0+6)   (Fanny Welle-Strand Horn, Elise Ringen, Synnøve Solemdal, Tora Berger) 1:19:37.9 (2+7)   (Marie Dorin Habert, Anais Bescond, Marine Bolliet, Sophie Boilley) 1:20:38.4 (1+7)

Cross-country skiing
Tour de Ski:
Stage 6 in Toblach, Italy:
Men's Sprint Freestyle:  Nikolay Morilov  3:03.4  Petter Northug  +0.0  Dario Cologna  +0.3
Women's Sprint Freestyle:  Marit Bjørgen  3:17.6  Kikkan Randall  +0.5  Justyna Kowalczyk  +2.3

Ice hockey
World Women's U18 Championship in Zlín, Czech Republic, quarterfinals:
 2–1 (OT) 
 2–1

Ski jumping
Four Hills Tournament:
Stage 3 in Innsbruck, Austria:
HS 130:  Andreas Kofler  252.8 points  Gregor Schlierenzauer  247.6  Taku Takeuchi  246.7

January 3, 2012 (Tuesday)

Alpine skiing
Women's World Cup in Zagreb, Croatia:
Slalom:  Marlies Schild  2:01.32 (59.34, 1:01.98)  Tina Maze   2:02.72 (1:00.24, 1:02.48)  Michaela Kirchgasser  2:03.59 (1:00.50, 1:03.09)

American football
NCAA bowl games:
Sugar Bowl in New Orleans: Michigan 23, Virginia Tech 20 (OT)

Cross-country skiing
Tour de Ski:
Stage 5 in Toblach, Italy:
Men's 5 km Classic Individual:  Alexander Legkov  13:49.5  Eldar Rønning  +1.7  Dario Cologna  +2.0
Women's 3 km Classic Individual:  Marit Bjørgen  10:49.2  Justyna Kowalczyk  +3.9  Astrid Uhrenholdt Jacobsen  +15.1

Ice hockey
World Junior Championship in Calgary, Canada, semifinals:
 3–2 (GWS) 
 5–6 
World Women's U18 Championship in Czech Republic (teams in bold advance to the semifinals, teams in italics advance to the quarterfinals):
Group A in Zlín:
 2–6 
 13–1 
Final standings: United States 9 points, Sweden 6, Czech Republic 3, Russia 0.
Group B in Přerov:
 1–6 
 7–0 
Final standings: Canada 9 points, Germany, Finland, Switzerland 3.

January 2, 2012 (Monday)

American football
NCAA New Year's Day bowl games:
TicketCity Bowl in Dallas: (20) Houston 30, (24) Penn State 14
Capital One Bowl in Orlando, Florida: (10) South Carolina 30, (21) Nebraska 13
Outback Bowl in Tampa, Florida: (12) Michigan State 33, (18) Georgia 30 (3OT)
Rose Bowl in Pasadena, California: (5) Oregon 45, (10) Wisconsin 38
Fiesta Bowl in Glendale, Arizona: (3) Oklahoma State 41, (4) Stanford 38 (OT)
National Football League:
St. Louis Rams head coach Steve Spagnuolo and general manager Billy Devaney; Tampa Bay Buccaneers head coach Raheem Morris; and Indianapolis Colts vice chairman Bill Polian and general manager Chris Polian are fired. (Bloomberg Businessweek)

Darts
PDC World Championship in London, England:
Final (both ENG): Andy Hamilton 3–7 Adrian Lewis 
Lewis wins the title for the second successive time.

Ice hockey
World Junior Championship in Calgary, Canada, quarterfinals:
 8–5 
 2–1 (OT) 
2012 NHL Winter Classic in Philadelphia:
New York Rangers 3, Philadelphia Flyers 2

January 1, 2012 (Sunday)

American football
National Football League, regular season final week (teams in bold win division title, teams in italics clinch wild-card berth, playoff seeding in parentheses):
AFC:
(1) New England Patriots 49, Buffalo Bills 21
(2) Baltimore Ravens 24, (6) Cincinnati Bengals 16
Tennessee Titans 23, (3) Houston Texans 22
Kansas City Chiefs 7, (4) Denver Broncos 3
(5) Pittsburgh Steelers 13, Cleveland Browns 9
San Diego Chargers 38, Oakland Raiders 26
Miami Dolphins 19, New York Jets 17
Jacksonville Jaguars 19, Indianapolis Colts 13
NFC:
(1) Green Bay 45, (6) Detroit Lions 41
(2) San Francisco 49ers 34, St. Louis Rams 27
(3) New Orleans Saints 45, Carolina Panthers 17
Saints quarterback Drew Brees sets NFL single-season records for completions and completion percentage, and the team breaks the mark for most total yards in a season.
(4) New York Giants 31, Dallas Cowboys 14
(5) Atlanta Falcons 45, Tampa Bay 24
Chicago Bears 17, Minnesota Vikings 13
Philadelphia Eagles 34, Washington Redskins 10
Arizona Cardinals 23, Seattle Seahawks 20 (OT)

Cross-country skiing
Tour de Ski:
Stage 4 in Oberstdorf, Germany:
Men's 10+10 km Pursuit:  Petter Northug  50:27.3  Dario Cologna  +0.3  Maxim Vylegzhanin  +0.6
Women's 5+5 km Pursuit:  Marit Bjørgen  27:16.0  Justyna Kowalczyk  +1.6  Therese Johaug  +1.8

Darts
PDC World Championship in London, England, semi-finals (ENG unless stated): 
Andy Hamilton 6–5 Simon Whitlock 
Adrian Lewis 6–5 James Wade

Ice hockey
World Women's U18 Championship in Czech Republic; matchday 1: 
Group A in Zlín:
 2–0 
 0–7 
Group B in Přerov:
 3–5 
 0–6

Ski jumping
Four Hills Tournament:
Stage 2 in Garmisch-Partenkirchen, Germany:
HS 140:  Gregor Schlierenzauer  274.5 points  Andreas Kofler  270.4  Daiki Ito  269.6

References

I
January 2012 sports events